Seven Dreams may refer to:

Seven Dreams: A Book of North American Landscapes, novel series by William T. Vollmann
Seven Dreams (album), by Gordon Jenkins (1953)

See also
Dream 7, 2009 mixed martial arts event
Dream No. 7, 2001 album by the band Reamonn
Legend of the Seven Dreams, 1988 album by saxophonist Jan Garbarek